Eric Gores (born 1983) is the son of businessman and Forbes billionaire Alec Gores, and former neighbor of actor Tom Arnold. In 2005, Gores costarred in a film written by Arnold, The Kid & I.  Gores was born with cerebral palsy.

Gores was educated in Holland, Michigan. He attended Lakewood Elementary, and Macatawa Bay middle School. He graduated West Ottawa High School in 2004 and studied acting at the Lee Strasberg Theatre Institute.

References

Further reading
Gores, Eric; Silverman, Paula. "Fresh Voices: A Hero On Screen and Off". The Lakeland Ledger. November 27, 2005.

External links

1983 births
American male film actors
Lee Strasberg Theatre and Film Institute alumni
Living people
People with cerebral palsy